Lieutenant General Nguyễn Vĩnh Nghi was an officer of the Army of the Republic of Vietnam. He served as the commander of IV Corps, which oversaw the Mekong Delta region of the country, from 4 May 1972 until 30 October 1974, when he was replaced by Major General Nguyễn Khoa Nam.

Early life and family
He was born in October 1932, in Gia Dinh (a district of Ho Chi Minh City ). He graduated from a French program high school. His wife is Kim Tuyet (daughter of Ms To thi Than, former Chairman of the National Vietnamese Women Association and former Chairman cum Editor of the daily newspaper ‘Saigon Moi’).

Military career
1951: He enlisted into the Dalat National Army Academy,  class of 5 (Hoang Dieu, 1/07/1951- 24/04/1952) and graduated with the rank of First Lieutenant. His teacher and friend was Second Lieutenant Nguyễn Văn Thiệu who became President of South Vietnam in 1965-1975.

1953: He was promoted to Second Lieutenant.

1954: He was promoted to a rank of captain and was appointed to the position of deputy battalion commander of the Vietnamese Republican Army.

1955: He was promoted to Major as Chief of the newly formed 31st Infantry Division. In early June, he was appointed Chief of Staff of this division.

1960: He was nominated as deputy commander of the National Military School of Dalat. Then he was sent to attend the US Army Command & General Staff at Fort Leavenworth, Kansas, United States.

1963:  He was promoted to Lieutenant Colonel, after the November coup.

1966: in February, he was promoted to Colonel.

1968: in June, he was promoted to Brigadier General and appointed as the 21st Division commander replacing Major-General Nguyen Van Minh.

1970: in June, he was promoted to Major General.

1974: Early in March, he was promoted to Lieutenant General and replaced Lieutenant General Nguyen Van Minh as Commander of the Thu Duc Infantry Army.

1975: in April, his last position was commander of the III Corps Forward Command, with the defensive frontline established at Phan Rang in the last days of the Republic of Vietnam.

Capture by North Vietnamese
On 16 April 1975 at 9 pm, as he moved south with Brigadier General Pham Ngoc Sang, the Commander 6th Aviation Division, and several Air Force officers and CIA Agent James Lewis after the capture of Phan Rang Air Base, he fell into a North Vietnamese ambush and was taken prisoner. Then he was sent to a detention camp in Suoi Dau, Khanh Hoa, and then to another camp in Danang. Finally, he was sent to a re-indoctrination camp in Son Tay, North Vietnam.

Freedom
1988:  He was released

1992: He left Vietnam to an unknown destination in the United States

Notes

References 

Army of the Republic of Vietnam generals